Tsering Dhondup, also known as Tsering Dhundup Yangdhar, is the Minister of Finance of the Tibetan-government-in-exile, officially known as Central Tibetan Administration (CTA).

Biography 
Dhondup was born in 1960 during his parents' escape to exile from Tibet after 1959 Tibetan uprising.

He attended school at the Tibetan Homes Foundation and Central School for Tibetans, Mussoorie in 1981.
He obtained Bachelor of Commerce degree at Panjab University, Chandigarh, in 1983. 
During this period, he was the President of the Tibetan Freedom Movement in Chandigarh.

He joined and worked for the Central Tibetan Administration in December 1984. 
He obtained a master's degree in Commerce at Himachal Pradesh University in 1993. 
In fall 1993 with a Fulbright Scholarship, he studied Business Management for one year at the University of Montana, United States.
 
He returned to India in October 1994, where he continued to work for the Central Tibetan Administration. He was Secretary of the Department of Education in 2000, and Department of Home in 2002, until October 2007 when his nomination as a Minister was approved by the 14th Tibetan Parliament in Exile.

From 2007 to 2011, he was Minister of Finance in the 13th Kashag, directed by Prime Minister Samdhong Rinpoche.

He was reelected as Minister of Finance in the 14th Kashag, directed by Prime Minister Lobsang Sangay.

References

External links 

1960 births
People from Dharamshala
Living people
Tibetan diaspora
Central Tibetan Administration
Tibetan politicians
Panjab University alumni
Himachal Pradesh University alumni
University of Montana alumni
Tibetan academics